Fabiola Zuluaga was the defending champion and successfully defended her title, by defeating Anabel Medina Garrigues 6–3, 6–2 in the final.

Seeds
The first two seeds received a bye into the second round.

Draw

Finals

Top half

Bottom half

References
 Official results archive (ITF)
 Official results archive (WTA)

Copa Colsanitas - Singles
2003 Singles